Elachista fabarella is a moth of the family Elachistidae that is found in Australia.

References

Moths described in 2011
fabarella
Moths of Australia